The 1963 World Table Tennis Championships – Swaythling Cup (men's team) was the 27th edition of the men's team championship.  

China won the gold medal defeating Japan 5–1 in the final. West Germany and Sweden both won a bronze medal after being eliminated at the semi final stage.

Medalists

Team

Swaythling Cup tables

Group A

Group B

Group C

Group D

Semifinals

Final

See also
List of World Table Tennis Championships medalists

References

-